The 2010 Mini Challenge season was the ninth season of the Mini Challenge UK. The season started on 10 April at Rockingham Motor Speedway and ended on 29 August at Thruxton Circuit. The season featured seven rounds across the UK.

Calendar

Entry list

Championship standings
Scoring system
Championship points were awarded for the first 15 positions in each Championship Race. Entries were required to complete 75% of the winning car's race distance in order to be classified and earn points. There were bonus points awarded for Pole Position and Fastest Lap.

Championship Race points

Drivers' Championship

JCW Class

Cooper S Class

Cooper Class

Mini Challenge UK
Mini Challenge UK